Snoopy in Space is an animated television series inspired by the Peanuts comic strip by Charles M. Schulz. Developed by Mark Evestaff and Betsy Walters, and produced by WildBrain Studios, the show debuted on November 1, 2019 on Apple TV+.

Cast
Terry McGurrin as Snoopy
Robert Tinkler as Woodstock
Ethan Pugiotto (Season 1) and Tyler Nathan (Season 2) as Charlie Brown
Hattie Kragten as Sally Brown
Christian Dal Dosso as Franklin
Isabella Leo as Lucy van Pelt
Wyatt White as Linus van Pelt
Holly Gorski as Marcie
Isis Moore as Peppermint Patty
Milo Toriel-McGibbon as Rerun van Pelt
Nicole Byer as C.A.R.A.
Julie Lemieux, Sean Cullen, David Berni, Ian James Corlett, Kirby Morrow, Andrew Francis, Kathleen Barr and Brian Drummond as Bird Buds

Episodes

Series Overview

Season 1 (2019)

Season 2 (2021)

Production

In December 2018, DHX Media announced that it would be producing new Peanuts material for Apple's then unnamed streaming service, starting with the animated Snoopy in Space. Months prior, Peanuts Worldwide announced a partnership with NASA to promote STEM to students through new content.

The Snoopy character had a history with the space agency dating back to the Apollo 10 mission. In the buildup to the show's release, Apple TV began streaming a documentary by Morgan Neville titled Peanuts in Space: Secrets of Apollo 10. Starring Ron Howard and Jeff Goldblum, the short was released in May 2019. Through the NASA partnership, the series uses live-action footage from the NASA archives.

Snoopy in Space debuted alongside the launch of Apple TV+ on November 1, 2019. DHX released the show's soundtrack to stream on Apple Music the same day.

The show was the last DHX show to be produced under the DHX Media name, before the studio would change its name to WildBrain to build upon its multi-channel network of the same name, which was subsequently renamed to "WildBrain Spark".

In October 2020, it was announced that a second season is in production. The second season premiered on November 12, 2021.

Promotion
A teaser for the series was released on July 17, 2019. The full trailer was released on September 27, 2019.

As part of the general NASA partnership with Peanuts Worldwide, McDonald's Happy Meals featured space-themed Snoopy toys and books over the summer of 2019. An astronaut Snoopy character balloon also flew in the 2019 Macy's Thanksgiving Day Parade. Space Foundation began hosting STEM lessons prior to the show's release. Apple Store locations launched Snoopy in Space-themed events alongside the series' debut.

Reception

On review aggregator Rotten Tomatoes, Snoopy in Space holds an approval rating of 100% based on 6 reviews, with an average score 8/10. In a positive review for Common Sense Media, Mandie Caroll praised the show's handling of the educational aspects, though she warned that older fans might miss the "gloomy" situations of traditional Peanuts stories. Decider's Joel Keller felt that the deeper aspects of Peanuts were missing, but still recommended the series to fans of Snoopy and space exploration. iMore's Lory Gil also noticed the lack of bite compared to earlier Peanuts specials, though she felt it still offered a good update for modern audiences.

Accolades

References

External links

 

Apple TV+ original programming
2019 American television series debuts
2021 American television series endings
2010s American animated television series
2020s American animated television series
2010s American comic science fiction television series
2020s American comic science fiction television series
2019 Canadian television series debuts
2010s Canadian animated television series
2020s Canadian animated television series
2010s Canadian comic science fiction television series
2020s Canadian comic science fiction television series
American children's animated comic science fiction television series
American children's animated space adventure television series
Animated television series about dogs
Animated television series about extraterrestrial life
Canadian children's animated space adventure television series
Canadian children's animated comic science fiction television series
English-language television shows
Works based on Peanuts (comic strip)
Television shows based on comic strips
Television series by DHX Media
Apple TV+ children's programming